The University of Cienfuegos "Carlos Rafael Rodríguez" (Spanish: Universidad de Cienfuegos "Carlos Rafael Rodríguez", UCF) is a public university located in Cienfuegos, Cuba.

Faculties
The university houses the following faculties:
 Agrarian Sciences
 Economic and Enterprise Sciences
 Engineering
 Social Sciences and Humanities

See also 

 Cienfuegos
Education in Cuba
List of universities in Cuba

External links
 University of Cienfuegos Website 

Cienfuegos
Buildings and structures in Cienfuegos